Verónica Cepede Royg was the defending champion, but lost in the final to Teliana Pereira, 7–6(8–6), 6–1.

Seeds

Main draw

Finals

Top half

Bottom half

References 
 Main draw

Seguros Bolivar Open Medellin - Singles